Daniel Day may refer to:

 Daniel Day (manufacturer) (1767–1848), American pioneer in woollen manufacturing
 Daniel Day (cricketer) (1807–1887), English cricketer
 Dapper Dan (designer) (born 1944), American fashion designer, born Daniel Day
 Daniel Day (darts player) (born 1986), English darts player